The 2021 Fyter Fest was the third annual Fyter Fest professional wrestling event produced by All Elite Wrestling (AEW). The event aired on TNT as a two-part series of television special episodes of AEW's weekly television program, Wednesday Night Dynamite. The two-week event was also the second event in AEW's "Welcome Back" tour, which celebrated AEW's resumption of live touring during the COVID-19 pandemic. The first night aired on July 14, 2021, and was held at the H-E-B Center at Cedar Park in Cedar Park, Texas, while the second night was held on July 21, 2021, at the Curtis Culwell Center in Garland, Texas.

Production

Background
Fyter Fest is a professional wrestling event held annually during the summer by All Elite Wrestling (AEW) since 2019; it was originally held in June before moving to July in 2020. Due to the COVID-19 pandemic that began effecting the industry in mid-March 2020, AEW held the majority of their programs from Daily's Place in Jacksonville, Florida; these events were originally held without fans, but the company began running shows at 10–15% capacity in August, before eventually running full capacity shows in May 2021. Also in May, AEW announced that they would be returning to live touring, beginning with a special episode of Dynamite titled Road Rager on July 7. The third event in the Fyter Fest chronology, it was announced to be held as the second event of AEW's "Welcome Back" tour and like the 2020 event, it was scheduled as a two-part special of Dynamite. The first night was held on July 14 at the H-E-B Center at Cedar Park in Cedar Park, Texas (Austin market) while the second night was held on July 21 at the Curtis Culwell Center in Garland, Texas (Dallas–Fort Worth market).

Storylines
Fyter Fest featured professional wrestling matches that involved different wrestlers from pre-existing scripted feuds and storylines. Wrestlers portrayed heroes, villains, or less distinguishable characters in scripted events that built tension and culminated in a wrestling match or series of matches. Storylines were produced on AEW's weekly television program, Dynamite, the supplementary online streaming shows, Dark and Elevation, and The Young Bucks' YouTube series Being The Elite.

Reception

Television ratings
The first night of Fyter Fest averaged 1,025,000 television viewers on TNT, with a 0.40 rating in AEW's key demographic. The second night of Fyter Fest drew 1,148,000 viewers, and a 0.44 rating in the key demographic.

Results

See also
2021 in professional wrestling

References

External links

2021
2020s American television specials
2021 American television episodes
2021 in professional wrestling
2021 in Texas
Events in Garland, Texas
Events in Texas
July 2021 events in the United States
Professional wrestling in Texas